Tenaspis angularis is a species of firefly in the beetle family Lampyridae. It is found in Central America and North America.

References

Further reading

 

Lampyridae
Articles created by Qbugbot
Beetles described in 1880